Hwana (also known as Hwona, Hona, Tuftera, Fiterya) is an Afro-Asiatic language spoken in Adamawa State, Nigeria.

Notes 

Biu-Mandara languages
Languages of Nigeria